Litoligia is a genus of moths belonging to the family Noctuidae.

The species of this genus are found in Europe and Japan.

Species:
 Litoligia literosa (Haworth, 1809)

References

Noctuidae
Noctuoidea genera